Jeremiah Ledbetter (born May 29, 1994) is an American football defensive end for the Jacksonville Jaguars of the National Football League (NFL). He played college football at Arkansas.

High school career
Ledbetter began his career at Olympia High School before transferring to Gainesville High School.

College career
Ledbetter began his collegiate career at Hutchinson Community College in 2013, finishing there as an All-American in 2014, with 24.5 tackles for loss and 15.5 sacks. He transferred to Arkansas and stepped in right away, making 55 tackles, 7.5 for loss, and two sacks as a junior in 2015. He topped those marks as a senior in 2016, with 5.5 sacks, and was credited with 49 total tackles, 7.5 for loss.

Professional career

Detroit Lions
The Detroit Lions selected Ledbetter in the sixth round with the 205th overall pick in the 2017 NFL Draft. On May 12, 2017, the Lions signed Ledbetter to a four-year, $2.54 million contract with a signing bonus of $144,160.

On September 1, 2018, Ledbetter was waived by the Lions.

Tampa Bay Buccaneers
On September 3, 2018, Ledbetter was signed to the Tampa Bay Buccaneers' practice squad. He was promoted to the active roster on December 19, 2018.

Ledbetter was waived/injured during final roster cuts on August 31, 2019, and reverted to the team's injured reserve list the next day. He was waived from injured reserve with an injury settlement on September 11.

Baltimore Ravens
On October 2, 2019, Ledbetter was signed to the Baltimore Ravens practice squad. He was released on October 21, 2019.

Tampa Bay Buccaneers (second stint)
On October 22, 2019, Ledbetter was re-signed to the Buccaneers' practice squad.

Ledbetter signed a reserve/future contract with the Buccaneers on December 30, 2019. Ledbetter was waived by the Buccaneers during final roster cuts on September 5, 2020, and was signed to the practice squad the following day. He was elevated to the active roster on October 17 for the team's week 6 game against the Green Bay Packers, and reverted to the practice squad after the game. He was signed to the active roster on December 2, 2020. In Week 16 against the Detroit Lions, Ledbetter recorded his first career sack on Chase Daniel during the 47–7 win. Ledbetter earned a Super Bowl championship when the Buccaneers won Super Bowl LV.

Ledbetter was given an exclusive-rights free agent tender by the Buccaneers on March 9, 2021. He was waived on August 31, 2021.

Arizona Cardinals
On September 3, 2021, Ledbetter was signed to the Arizona Cardinals practice squad. He was released on October 26.

Jacksonville Jaguars
On November 1, 2021, Ledbetter was signed to the Jacksonville Jaguars practice squad. He signed a reserve/future contract on January 10, 2022. He was waived/injured on August 10, 2022, and was placed on injured reserve the next day. He was released on August 22. He was re-signed to the practice squad on October 12, 2022. He was signed to the active roster on December 28, 2022.

References

External links
Tampa Bay Buccaneers bio
Arkansas Razorbacks bio

1994 births
Living people
American football defensive ends
American football defensive tackles
Arizona Cardinals players
Baltimore Ravens players
Arkansas Razorbacks football players
Detroit Lions players
Hutchinson Blue Dragons football players
Players of American football from Orlando, Florida
Tampa Bay Buccaneers players
Jacksonville Jaguars players